Peter Aalbæk Jensen (born 8 April 1956 in Osted) is a Danish film producer who in 1992 with director Lars von Trier founded the Danish film company Zentropa and later its huge studio complex Filmbyen. His father was writer Erik Aalbæk Jensen.

Zentropa is known for the Dogme95-manifesto and such projects as Dogville (2003) starring Nicole Kidman, Dancer in the Dark (2000) starring Björk, The Five Obstructions, and the Oscar-nominated After the Wedding (2006).

Peter Aalbæk Jensen has executive-produced over 70 theatrical feature films and many television productions, has founded a long list of subsidiary companies and is widely regarded as the most important Danish film producer since the 1990s.

In autumn 2008 Peter Aalbæk Jensen was a judge on the Danish version of Got Talent.

In 2017, nine women accused Aalbæk Jensen of sexual harassment and workplace bullying.

References

External links

Interview with Peter Aalbæk Jensen
Zentropa at IMDb
Zentropa official site
Filmbyen official site

1956 births
Living people
Danish film producers
Danish television personalities
People from Lejre Municipality
Bodil Honorary Award recipients